Makowo is a village  in Gairo District in the Morogoro Region of Tanzania.

Notes

Populated places in Morogoro Region
Wards of Morogoro Region